On May 19, 1986, a series of radar and visual contacts with unidentified flying objects (UFOs) took place across the Brazilian states of São Paulo, Rio de Janeiro, Minas Gerais and Goiás, becoming locally known as the "Night of the UFOs".

Incident
At around 8:15 p.m. BRT on the 19th of May 1986, Sérgio Mota da Silva, an air traffic controller at São José dos Campos Airport (SJK), spotted three bright lights hovering over the airport on the night sky, and Guarulhos International Airport detected contacts in the vinicity of São José dos Campos. Sérgio observed the objects with a pair of binoculars, noticing that they seemed to emit a bright red light, but often changing colors to yellow, green and orange-like. Dimming the runway lights, he noticed that the objects seemed to approach the airport, moving away once the lights were increased again.

At 9:08 p.m. BRT, a EMB 121 Xingu plane, callsign PT-MBZ, on its way towards SJK from Brasília, reports seeing bright red lights at radial 150 of SJK's VOR, near the coast moving east to west. This aircraft was flown by Colonel Ozires Silva, the founder of Embraer, who was returning from a meeting with President José Sarney and who would take office as president of Petrobras on the following day. According to Ozires, the objects seemed like "big red stars". He then proceeded, of his own accord, to attempt to approach the objects, without success.

By 9:39 p.m. BRT Santa Cruz Air Force Base was put on alert due to the presence of several unidentified radar plots around São José dos Campos. Around half an hour later, Anápolis Air Force Base reports the detection of radar echoes at radial 270 of its VOR, prompting the air base to also be put on alert. The radar contacts obtained by Anápolis were not being detected by the Center of Military Operations (COpM) located in CINDACTA I.

At 10:27 p.m., a F-5E of 1º/1ºGAvCa "Jambock", callsign JB17, was scrambled from Santa Cruz AFB, taking off just seven minutes later. The pilot, approaching at an altitude of 17,000 feet, reported having detected a radar plot and having visual contact with a white light below its level, that then proceeded to climb, steadily maintaining itself 10–12 miles away and 10° above his aircraft until it reached 33,000 feet. During this period, the pilot reported that the light changed from white to red, green and then white again. The object was followed towards the sea until it was around 180 miles away from Santa Cruz, when the F-5 reached bingo fuel and had to return to base.

At 10:48, Anápolis AFB launched their first Mirage 2000 interceptor of the 1st Air Defense Group "Jaguar", callsign JG116, who eventually obtained five radar contacts but no visual contacts. At one point, the Mirage managed to get within 2 miles of one of the contacts, whose movements seemed to indicate zigzagging and 90 degree turns, before it rapidly moved away despite the interceptor's supersonic speed. In a 1993 interview to TV Globo, the pilot estimated the object's velocity at Mach 15.

By 10:50 p.m., a second F-5E, callsign JB07, took off from Santa Cruz, reporting visual and radar contact with an object emitting a bright red light. According to the Brazilian Air Force report, after an unsuccessful attempt to close the distance, the light seemed to "turn off", at the same time as the radar contact was lost. Then, for a moment the controller at Santa Cruz Air Base detected 13 radar plots directly behind JB07, instructing the aircraft to turn 180 degrees. As the F-5E turned, however, no visual or radar contacts were obtained by the fighter.

Other two Mirage 2000 interceptors were launched in Anápolis, but neither had any visual nor radar contacts. In total, 21 radar plots were obtained during the incident.

Press conference
The Minister of the Air Force, Brigadier Lt. of the Air Octávio Júlio Moreira Lima conceded a press conference on the 23rd of May along with the fighter pilots, confirming the events of the 19th and stating, "It's not about believing or not [in aliens]. We can only give out technical information. There are several hypotheses. Technically, I'd tell you gentlemen that we have no explanation."

Declassification of documents
The official Brazilian Air Force report on the incident was declassified on September 25, 2009. In its final considerations, the document stated, among other things, that the unidentified aerial phenomena were capable of:
 Varying their velocities from subsonic to supersonic, as well as hover;
 Varying their altitudes from below 5,000 to above 40,000 feet;
 Emitting white, green, and red lights, or emitting no light at all;
 Sudden acceleration or deacceleration;
 Turning with constant radiuses as well as sharp 90 degree turns;
 Showing intelligence in their capabilities to maintain distance from the observers as well as flying in formation, though not being necessarily crewed.

See also
 UFO sightings in Brazil
 List of UFO sightings

References

Alleged UFO-related aviation incidents
1986 in Brazil
Aviation accidents and incidents in 1986
Aviation accidents and incidents in Brazil